(born April 23, 1981 in Hyōgo Prefecture) is a Japanese softball player who won the gold medal at the 2008 Summer Olympics.

References

External links
 
 

1981 births
Japanese softball players
Living people
Olympic softball players of Japan
Olympic gold medalists for Japan
Softball players at the 2008 Summer Olympics
Olympic medalists in softball
Asian Games medalists in softball
Medalists at the 2008 Summer Olympics
Softball players at the 2006 Asian Games
Medalists at the 2006 Asian Games
Asian Games gold medalists for Japan
21st-century Japanese women